Chennai Spikers, founded in 2011 was a franchise volleyball team based in Chennai, Tamil Nadu that played in the Indian Volley League. Chennai Spikers have won the first edition of the Indian Volley League in 2011.

Honours

League
Indian Volley League
Champions (1): 2011

References

Volleyball in India
2011 establishments in Tamil Nadu
Sport in Chennai